Eric Lees Faulkner  (27 December 1919 – 30 May 1997) was a New Zealand local-body politician. He served as mayor of Tauranga from 1977 to 1980.

Early life and family
Born in Tauranga on 27 December 1919, Faulkner was the son of Arthur Lees Faulkner and Gladys Ursula Faulkner (née Hammond), and the great-grandson of settler John Lees Faulkner. Eric Faulkner was educated at Tauranga District High School, and served as a warrant officer class 1 for three years during World War II with the 2nd New Zealand Expeditionary Force 6th Reserve Military Transport Company in North Africa and Italy.

In 1947, Faulkner married Constance Winifred Crawford, and the couple went on to have four children.

Local-body politics
Faulkner served as a member of the Tauranga City Council and deputy mayor from 1962 to 1977, and mayor from 1977 to 1980.

Other activities
Faulkner was grocery and supermarket operator, until his retirement in 1976. He was also active in St John New Zealand, chairing the Tauranga branch for 40 years. He was appointed a Serving Brother of the Order of St John in 1968, promoted to Officer of the Order of St john in 1976, and further promoted to Commander of the Order of St John in 1983. Faulkner was also a justice of the peace.

Death
Faulkner died on 30 May 1997, and he was buried at Pyes Pa Cemetery. His wife died in 2016.

References

1919 births
1997 deaths
People from Tauranga
People educated at Tauranga Boys' College
New Zealand businesspeople in retailing
Tauranga City Councillors
Deputy mayors of places in New Zealand
Mayors of Tauranga
New Zealand justices of the peace
Commanders of the Order of St John
Burials at Pyes Pa Cemetery
New Zealand military personnel of World War II